Homadaula is a genus of moths in the family Galacticidae.

Selected species
Homadaula albida Mey, 2004
Homadaula anisocentra Meyrick, 1922
Homadaula calamitosa (Meyrick, 1930)
Homadaula coscinopa Lower, 1900
Homadaula dispertita Meyrick, 1922
Homadaula lasiochroa Lower, 1899
Homadaula maritima Mey, 2007
Homadaula montana Mey, 2007
Homadaula myriospila Meyrick, 1907
Homadaula poliodes Meyrick, 1907
Homadaula punctigera (Rebel, 1910)
Homadaula ravula Mey, 2004
Homadaula submontana Mey, 2007
Homadaula watamomaritima Mey, 2007
Homadaula wieseri Mey, 2011

References

 , 2007, Esperiana Buchreihe zur Entomologie Memoir 3: 333-339.
 , 2011: New and little known species of Lepidoptera of southwestern Africa. Esperiana Buchreihe zur Entomologie Memoir 6: 146-261.

Galacticidae
Moth genera